Ouyang Xiadan (born 28 July 1977) is a Chinese news anchor for China Central Television, the main state announcer of China.

She won the Golden Mike Award in 2007, and received Golden Eagle Award for Best Programme Host in 2008.

Biography
Ouyang Xiadan was born in July 1977 in Qixing District of Guilin, Guangxi, she secondary studied at Guilin High School, she entered Communication University of China in 1995, majoring in broadcasting, where she graduated in 1999.

After graduation, she joined the Shanghai Television, and she anchored the Shanghai Morning and Evening News for four years. Ouyang Xiadan joined the China Central Television in October 2003, she anchored the First Time between 2003 and 2009. She hosted the Focus on since August 2009 and anchored the Xinwen Lianbo since August 8, 2011. Ouyang was also one of the hosts of the CCTV New Year's Gala in 2010.

Works

Television
 Evening News
 Shanghai Morning
 First Time
 Focus on 
 Xinwen Lianbo

Awards
 First Time - 2007 Golden Mike Award.
 2008 Golden Eagle Award for Best Programme Host

References

1977 births
People from Guilin
Communication University of China alumni
Living people
CCTV newsreaders and journalists
21st-century Chinese people